Mohajeran Rural District is a rural district (dehestan) in Lalejin District, Bahar County, Hamadan Province, Iran. At the 2006 census, its population (including Mohajeran, which was subsequently detached from the rural district and promoted to city status) was 19,292, in 4,406 families; excluding Mohajeran, the population (as of 2006) was 11,536, in 2,709 families. The rural district has 10 villages.

References 

Rural Districts of Hamadan Province
Bahar County